Elizabeth Margaret Smith, Baroness Smith of Gilmorehill,  (born 4 June 1940), is a British peer and patron of the arts. She is the widow of John Smith, the former Labour Party leader.

Born Elizabeth Margaret Bennett, Smith was educated at Hutchesons' Girls Grammar School and Glasgow University.

Baroness Smith is president of Scottish Opera and served as chairman of the Edinburgh Festival Fringe from 1995 to 2012. She is also a governor of the English-Speaking Union and a board member of the Centre for European Reform. Within a year of her husband's death, she was created a life peer as Baroness Smith of Gilmorehill, of Gilmorehill in the District of the City of Glasgow on 17 February 1995.

Smith received an Honorary Doctorate from Heriot-Watt University in 1998.

She has three daughters, including Sarah Smith who is the BBC News North America Editor.

References

1940 births
Deputy Lieutenants of Edinburgh
Life peeresses created by Elizabeth II
Labour Party (UK) life peers
Living people
Edinburgh Festival Fringe staff
Alumni of the University of Glasgow
People educated at Hutchesons' Grammar School
Spouses of British politicians